The goal of the Mallory and Irvine Research Expedition of 1999 was to discover evidence of whether George Mallory and Andrew Irvine had been the first to summit Mount Everest in their attempt of 8–9 June 1924. The expedition was organised by regular Everest expedition leader Eric Simonson and advised by researcher Jochen Hemmleb, with a team of climbers from the United States, the United Kingdom, and Germany. Hemmleb's investigations of reports of earlier sightings and photographs had led him to identify what he believed was the area in which Irvine's body lay, some distance below where his ice axe had been found by Percy Wyn-Harris on the expedition led by Hugh Ruttledge in 1933. The team hoped in particular to find a camera on Irvine's body which, had the pair been successful, should have contained a picture of the summit. After commencing the search on 1 May 1999, Conrad Anker mistakenly got off course and, surprisingly, found Mallory's body, not Irvine's.

Mallory lay face-down, arms outstretched as if to break a sliding fall, with one broken leg and a serious wound to the skull, but otherwise very well-preserved. It seemed probable that he had been a victim of a fall while roped to Irvine. The body was only an hour or two from the safety of their camp.

Many artefacts were found on the body, including a pocket knife, altimeter, and snow-goggles, but no camera. Three discoveries in particular fuel continuing speculation:
First, a pair of goggles were in Mallory's pocket, suggesting he was descending at night when he fell (though he may have had a second pair, ripped off in his fall).
Second, on an envelope he had noted the amounts of oxygen in each of their cylinders, figures which suggest a slight possibility that the pair may have taken three cylinders on their final climb, rather than two as generally believed.
Finally it had been reported that Mallory carried a photograph of his beloved wife Ruth with him which he planned to place on the summit in the event of success; it was not found among his remaining personal possessions.

The expedition interred Mallory where he lay.

Subsequent expeditions

During a second expedition in 2001, most of the 1999 team returned to search further. Many discoveries were made, including nearly every pre-World War II camp on the mountain. Jake Norton and Brent Okita re-discovered the 1924 Camp VI, last occupied by Mallory and Irvine. Eventually, the team abandoned their search for Irvine to rescue several other climbing parties stranded on the mountain and in deep distress. The victims included two Chinese glaciologists, three Russian climbers, an American guide, and his Guatemalan client. Several of the climbers were suffering from high altitude cerebral oedema, a condition where the victim can hallucinate, lose balance, and eventually become unable to walk, due to lack of oxygen (which, high up on Everest, is only one-third the partial pressure of oxygen at sea level) in the brain. This condition has led to many deaths and injuries in mountaineering.

In early 2004, Jake Norton and Dave Hahn returned to Everest with a film team and support from Sherpas Danuru and Tashi to look once more for evidence of Irvine and answers to what happened to Mallory and Irvine in 1924. While the team was able to scour the Yellow Band, the combination of a small team and uncooperative weather eliminated most chances of a major discovery.

During that same season, search parties were on the mountain from the website EverestNews, as well as an expedition led by Russell Brice, which included Graham Hoyland (Howard Somervell's grand-nephew and member of the 1999 Mallory and Irvine Research Expedition).

In 2007, the Altitude Everest Expedition led by Conrad Anker, who had found Mallory's body, tried to retrace Mallory's last steps.

Jochen Hemmleb led another search expedition in 2010, examining new terrain on the Northeast Ridge, specifically near a feature called "The Warts." Nothing of consequence was discovered.

See also
List of Mount Everest expeditions

External links
 1999 Mallory & Irvine Research Expedition website by MountainZone
 1999 Mallory & Irvine Research Expedition website by PBS/NOVA
 1999 Mallory & Irvine Research Expedition website by AFFIMER
 Mallory and Irvine Research expedition 2001
 Mallory and Irvine Research expedition 2004
 Mallory's body shortly after its discovery on May 1, 1999
 Mallery and Irvine team member Jochen Hemmleb Interview
Mallery and Irvine team member Jake Norton Interview

1999